Thokchom   is a sagei (title or surname) specific to the Meitei/Meetei community of Manipur, a state in the northeastern region of India. Thokchom belongs to the Moirang or Yek clans. The Moirang clan is the biggest community in Manipur.

Status
The Thokchom surname has been well known since ancient times. Presently, Thokchom Leikai are found in Mayang Imphal, Uchiwa, Keisamthong, Langthabal, Samurau, Wangoi, Yumnam huidrom, Sekmaijing, Moirang, Ningthoukhong, Charangpat, Kwakeithel, Singjamei and Keishampat. A village named Thokchom also exists in the Thoubal District, in the town of Kakching, in Manipur. However, they can be found in almost all the leikais and villages of Manipur. There is also a large population with the Thokchom surname in Cachar, Assam.

See also 
 Ningombam

Meitei culture